Kyjovice is a municipality and village in Opava District in the Moravian-Silesian Region of the Czech Republic. It has about 800 inhabitants.

History
The first written mention of Kyjovice is from 1430. The village was founded around 1290.

References

External links

Villages in Opava District